Bascom is both a surname and a given name. Notable people with the name include:

Surname:
Bernadette Bascom (born 1962), American R&B singer, actress
Earl W. Bascom (1906–1995), American-Canadian artist, inventor, rodeo cowboy, Mormon Bishop
Elva Bascom (1870–1944), librarian, school teacher, editor for the American Library Association
Emma Curtiss Bascom (1828–1916), American educator, suffragist and reformer
Florence Bascom (1862–1945), American geologist
George Nicholas Bascom (1837–1862), U.S. Army officer who arrested Chief Cochise, igniting the Apache Wars
Henry Bidleman Bascom (1796–1850), American religious leader, Congressional Chaplain, Methodist Bishop
Jeremy Bascom (born 1981), Guyanese sprinter
John Bascom (1827–1911), American educator, author, President of the University of Wisconsin
John L. Bascom (1860–1950), American lawyer, Iowa state legislator
John U. Bascom (1925–2013), American surgeon and researcher
Julia Bascom, American autism rights activist
Kerry Bascom (born  1968), American retired professional women's basketball player
Marion C. Bascom (1925–2012), American religious leader, civil-rights activist
Oliver Bascom (1815–1869), American businessman, Erie Canal Commissioner
Rose Bascom (1922–1993), Native American Hollywood actress, rodeo performer, hall of fame inductee
Rose Flanders Bascom (1880–1915), America's first female lion tamer
Ruth Bascom (1926–2010), American politician, mayor of Eugene, Oregon 
Ruth Henshaw Bascom (1772–1848), American folk artist
Willard Bascom (1916–2000), American engineer, oceanographer, underwater archaeologist
William Bascom (1912–1981), American anthropologist, folklorist, ethnologist

Given name:
Bascom Sine Deaver (1882–1944), U.S. Federal judge
Bascom Sine Deaver Jr. (born 1930), American physicist, professor
Bascom Giles (1900–1993), American, Texas land commissioner
Bascom Ray Lakin (1901–1984), American evangelical preacher
Bascom Lamar Lunsford (1882–1973), American folklorist, musician, author of song "Good Old Mountain Dew"
Bascom Joseph Rowlett (1886–1947), American architect
Bascom N. Timmons (1890–1987), American newspaperman

Middle name:
John Bascom Crenshaw (1861–1942), American college athletic director, founder of Georgia Tech's lacrosse team
Asbury Bascom Davidson (1855–1920), American lawyer, Lt. Governor of Texas
Harold Bascom Durham Jr. (1942–1967), American recipient of the Medal of Honor during the Vietnam War
Campbell Bascom Slemp (1870–1943), American Congressman, secretary to President Calvin Coolidge
George Bascom Sparkman (1855–1896), American lawyer, mayor of Tampa, Florida
George Bascom Sparkman Jr. (1886–1924), American football player and coach
Henry Bascom Steagall (1873–1843), American politician
Lester Bascom Wikoff (1893–1978), American educator, Rotarian
John Bascom Wolfe (1904–1988), American psychologist
Ashley Bascom Wright (1841–1897), American politician

See also
Bascomb
Bascombe
Bascome
Baskcomb
Boscombe